Locust Grove is a city in Henry County, Georgia, United States. The population was 5,402 at the 2010 census, up from 2,322 in 2000. Some unincorporated communities such as Luella and many rural areas surround Locust Grove, and those communities have Locust Grove postal addresses.

Locust Grove has experienced a growth in population and in businesses coming into the area. In 1900 the population of the city was 254 and is now over 5,000.

History
The community was named for a grove of locust trees near the original town site. Georgia General Assembly incorporated Locust Grove in 1893.

Geography

Locust Grove is located in southern Henry County at  (33.345499, -84.104991). U.S. Route 23 passes through the center of town, leading north  to McDonough, the county seat, and southeast  to Jackson. Interstate 75 passes through the western portion of Locust Grove, with access from Exit 212 (Bill Gardner Parkway). I-75 leads northwest  to downtown Atlanta and southeast  to Macon.

Major highways
  Interstate 75
  U.S. Highway 23
  Georgia State Route 42
  Georgia State Route 155
  Georgia State Route 401

Demographics

2020 census

As of the 2020 United States census, there were 8,947 people, 2,571 households, and 1,837 families residing in the city.

2000 census
As of the census of 2000, there were 2,322 people, 817 households, and 637 families residing in the city. The racial makeup of the city was 82.00% White, 14.38% African American, 0.60% Native American, 0.43% Asian, 0.09% Pacific Islander, 1.08% from other races, and 1.42% from two or more races. Hispanic or Latino of any race were 2.07% of the population.

There were 817 households, out of which 41.1% had children under the age of 18 living with them, 55.9% were married couples living together, 15.5% had a female householder with no husband present, and 22.0% were non-families. 18.1% of all households were made up of individuals, and 6.4% had someone living alone who was 65 years of age or older. The average household size was 2.84 and the average family size was 3.18.

In the city, the age distribution of the population shows 29.4% under the age of 18, 8.7% from 18 to 24, 35.2% from 25 to 44, 18.4% from 45 to 64, and 8.3% who were 65 years of age or older. The median age was 32 years. For every 100 females, there were 99.3 males. For every 100 females age 18 and over, there were 91.4 males.

The median income for a household in the city was $42,188, and the median income for a family was $46,042. Males had a median income of $32,094 versus $22,845 for females. The per capita income for the city was $16,120. About 5.6% of families and 8.8% of the population were below the poverty line, including 12.3% of those under age 18 and 9.3% of those age 65 or over.

Attractions
Tanger Outlet Center opened for business in the fall of 1994. Since that time many new businesses have made Locust Grove their home. Tanger Outlet Center tenants include Coach, J.Crew, Jones New York, Liz Claiborne, Gap, Banana Republic, Old Navy, Pac Sun, Polo Ralph Lauren, Reebok, Tommy Hilfiger, Nautica, Aeropostale, Jockey, Eddie Bauer, Nike and more.

Locust Grove is also home to Noah's Ark, a non-profit preserve and rehabilitation facility home to more than 1,000 animals. A group home sharing the site was previously licensed by the state of Georgia to provide residential care for up to 24 children but has since closed.

Locust Grove has a platform for watching the Norfolk Southern line that runs parallel to State Route 42/US Highway 23. It is equipped with a scanner radio that allows visitors to the platform to listen in to the local railroad frequency, which broadcasts out of the defect detector in nearby Jenkinsburg.

Schools

Public

Elementary
 Locust Grove Elementary School
 Unity Grove Elementary School
 Luella Elementary School
 New Hope Elementary School
 Bethlehem Elementary School

Middle
 Locust Grove Middle School
 Luella Middle School
 Ola Middle School

High
 Locust Grove High School
 Luella High School
 Ola High School

Private
 Strong Rock Christian School
 Heritage Baptist Christian School

References

External links
 City of Locust Grove official website
 Locust Grove Institute historical marker

Cities in Georgia (U.S. state)
Cities in Henry County, Georgia